Norman Victor Alexander Ullman (born December 26, 1935) is a former ice hockey forward. He previously played for the Detroit Red Wings and Toronto Maple Leafs of the National Hockey League (NHL). He was inducted into the Hockey Hall of Fame in 1982.

Playing career
Norm Ullman began his career with the Edmonton Oil Kings of the WCJHL, before moving to the Edmonton Flyers of the WHL. He turned pro with the Detroit Red Wings of the National Hockey League in the 1955–56 NHL season.

He was renowned as an excellent stick handler, as well as one of the paramount forecheckers in hockey history - and for his stamina and consistency which was important centring a line with Gordie Howe and Ted Lindsay in only his second season with Detroit.

His career statistics rank him among the greatest centres to ever play in the NHL, with 490 career regular-season goals and 739 assists for 1229 points. He had sixteen NHL seasons of 20 or more goals.

Ullman led Detroit in goals in 1961, 1965, and 1966 and led the league in 1964–65 with 42 goals. In that same season he missed the overall scoring title by 4 points, second to Stan Mikita, and was voted a first team All Star.

He appeared in eleven All Star games during his 20-year career and scored 30 goals and added 53 assists during Stanley Cup Playoff action in 106 games played.  Ullman was twice the playoff scoring leader.

He was part of a six-player blockbuster transaction in which he was traded along with Paul Henderson and Floyd Smith from the Red Wings to the Toronto Maple Leafs for Frank Mahovlich, Pete Stemkowski and Garry Unger on March 4, 1968. The Maple Leafs and Red Wings were in fifth and sixth place respectively at the bottom of the East Division standings at the time of the deal. Ullman finished his NHL career with Toronto and ended his hockey career after two seasons with the WHA's Edmonton Oilers.

He was inducted into the Hockey Hall of Fame on September 8, 1982.   In 1998, he was ranked number 90 on The Hockey News' list of the 100 Greatest Hockey Players.

Career statistics

Regular season and playoffs

Career awards
1965: Most goals (Later called Maurice 'Rocket' Richard Trophy)

Personal life 

Ullman is the uncle of ballet dancer and choreographer Darren Anderson. Ullman is the father of lawyer Gordon Ullman and grandfather of Maxwell Ullman.

See also
 List of NHL statistical leaders
 List of NHL players with 1,000 points
List of NHL players with 1,000 games played

References

External links

1935 births
Canadian ice hockey centres
Canadian people of German descent
Detroit Red Wings players
Edmonton Flyers (WHL) players
Edmonton Oil Kings (WCHL) players
Edmonton Oilers (WHA) players
Hockey Hall of Fame inductees
Ice hockey people from Alberta
Living people
Toronto Maple Leafs players